Marengo is a village in the Canadian province of Saskatchewan within the Rural Municipality of Milton No. 292 and Census Division No. 13. It is located within the Sun West School Division.

History 
Marengo incorporated as a village on November 5, 1910. The village originally incorporated under the name of Melbourne, which was probably a preliminary name given by the Canadian Northern Railway. However, the post office was given the name Marengo in 1911, named after Marengo, Illinois, the hometown of pioneer J. Ray Goodrich. Later in 1911, its name was changed to Fuller after a manager of a ranch, because the post office would not allow "Melbourne". After three years, it changed back to Marengo. 

On October 8, 2020, a grain elevator caught on fire in the town; the fire was expected and no one was injured.

Demographics 

References

Villages in Saskatchewan
Milton No. 292, Saskatchewan
Division No. 13, Saskatchewan